Tickets issued from British Rail's APTIS system had a considerable amount of detail, presented in a consistent, standard format. The design for all tickets was created by Colin Goodall. This format has formed the basis for all subsequent ticket issuing systems introduced on the railway network – ticket-office based, self-service and conductor-operated machines alike.

Much of the following summary is therefore applicable to the other systems featured in the "British railway ticket machines (computerised)" section.

Colours
The coloured bands at the top and bottom varied as follows:
Orange: standard tickets (Rail Settlement Plan No 9399)
Green: Weekly season ticket
Grey or blue: Monthly or longer, but not annual, season ticket (stronger material)
Gold: Annual season ticket (stronger material)

Features

1: Class of travel

Either First (1ST) or Standard (originally shown as 2ND; when Second Class was renamed Standard Class in 1988, the abbreviation became STD, as shown here).

2: Ticket type

Up to sixteen characters. SUPERSAVER RTN, shown here, is a common type: a cheap-rate ticket for longer journeys, valid for one month but with time restrictions. Hundreds of different ticket types have been seen; many have been short-lived.

3: Number of passengers

Usually only one adult or one child per ticket (hence the headings in the singular). Group tickets can be issued for any number and combination: the number is shown in words up to NINE, but above this figures are used (for example, 17***, with asterisks to prevent fraudulent filling of spaces with other numbers).

4: Portion indicator

Travel tickets can be singles (SGL), the outward portion of a return (OUT) or the return portion of a return (RTN). Some tickets issued for special trains and charters were single-portion returns showing OUT&RTN, although ordinary tickets for scheduled services were never issued in this format. In the illustrated example, this is the journey back to Bradford-on-Avon. The distinction between the two portions of a return ticket is required because certain ticket types have different restrictions for the outward and return portions. For example, Savers allow a break of journey on the return portion, but not the outward portion; also the outward portion must be on the date shown, but the return portion can be on days within a month of the date shown.

Clause 17 of the National Rail Conditions of Carriage states that "A return ticket (including a two-part return ticket) is only valid for the outward journey shown on that ticket if the ticket is completely unused. You may not use the outward part of a return ticket after you have used the return part." This is to prevent the 'reversing' of tickets where a cheaper ticket can be bought by travelling in the opposite direction (e.g. purchasing a return OUT of London, when actually travelling in to London).

5: Status code

If this field is blank, one adult is travelling at full fare. Any form of concession causing the fare to be reduced will be shown here – examples are:
 CHILD
 SNR (SNRCZ on early APTIS) – Senior Railcard
 NSE – Network Railcard
 Y-P or 16 - 25 (Y - P on early APTIS) – Young Persons Railcard
 PRIV – railway staff privilege card
 CHPRV – privilege card for dependent child of railway staff
 LACON – various local authority concessions
 NDEAL – New Deal Photocard
GOLDC – Annual Gold card
HMF – HM Forces Railcard
CHHMF – Child Dependent of HM Forces Railcard Holder

6: Date

Always in DD.MMM.YY format, where MMM is a three-letter abbreviation of the month's name. Non-standard abbreviations were used for some of the months, in order to make it harder to fraudulently alter a ticket's validity. These are shown below in italics:

JNR, FBY, MCH, APR, MAY, JUN, JLY, AUG, SEP, OCT, NOV, DMR.

7: Advance dating indicator
If an A is present next to the date, the ticket was bought before the date of travel. Standard travel tickets can be bought up to one year in advance.

8: Serial number
A number unique to each individual transaction. OUT and RTN pairs of tickets have the same number – in the above example, the OUT ticket from Bradford-on-Avon to Leamington Spa would also be numbered 08661.

9: Machine number
A number unique to that machine – when a machine changes location, it retains this number. The lowest-numbered APTIS machine was 2000 (which was still in use until July 2006 – at Northolt Park, on the Chiltern Railways network – making it one of the last machines still in place), and the range continued with very few gaps through to 5168. A few machine numbers were never used. The order of numbering did not seem to depend on the machine build date; the mid-3000 range was used on the very earliest machines.

10: Magnetic strip encoding indicator
The theta symbol (θ) began to appear on APTIS tickets around late 1988, indicating that the magnetic strip on the reverse was encoded with data, allowing the ticket to operate the automatic barriers that were being installed at London Underground stations at the time. Such barriers are now in common use at National Rail stations as well.

11: National Location Code
The National Location Code (NLC) of the station or issuing point at which the machine is based. Because APTIS tickets can be issued remotely, i.e. from a station other than the machine's "home" location, checking the NLC is the only way to confirm where a ticket was issued.

12: Region letter
Shows the historic region with which the NLC is associated:
 S – Southern
 W – Western
 M – London Midland
 E – Eastern
 H – Scottish
 B was sometimes used for travel centre, telesales or travel agency locations.

As sectorisation had happened by the time APTIS was introduced, these distinctions had lost some of their relevance.

13: Window number
The first machine at a location would be numbered 01, with subsequent machines being 02, 03 and so on. Spare machines were allocated to some of the larger stations on the network for use in case of machine breakdowns at that station or nearby ones, or for use in accounting, barcode-scanning, training and similar; these were numbered downwards from 99 (very few stations had more than two).

At stations equipped with modern issuing systems (such as Fujitsu STAR), the window numbers often begin higher than 01, for example at 30.

14: "From" station
Station of origin for that portion of the journey. Restricted to sixteen characters. An asterisk was placed after names of less than fifteen characters, to prevent fraudulent amendments to station names (for example, CAMBRIDGE to CAMBRIDGE HEATH).

15: Validity indicator
A description of the conditions of validity, again to a maximum of sixteen characters. Tickets whose validity restrictions were complex, as in this example, showed SEE RESTRCTIONS (originally SEE RESTRICTNS) or AS ADVERTISED, depending on the ticket type; other common examples were ON DATE SHOWN, THREE DAYS and ONE MONTH.

16: Fare paid
Almost all fares were in multiples of £0.05. Rounding was done in the passenger's favour: for example, a Railcard discount of one-third would be rounded to 34% (i.e. 66% of the full fare), downwards to the nearest £0.05. In fact, APTIS could apply any whole discount from 1% up to 99% and it was how the various companies decided what discount to apply e.g. Senior Citizen at 33%. This discount routine also introduced Privilege Fares based on current charges and allowed return fares to be used where previously only single fares had been the basis for charging.

17: Payment method
As follows:
 M: cash
 X: credit, debit or charge card
 Q: cheque
 W: Railway Warrant or Rail Travel Voucher

18: Destination
Destination station for that portion of the journey. Restricted to sixteen characters, with the asterisk used to fill space as before.

19: Route
Again restricted to sixteen characters. Hundreds of routes exist, but most are either "positive" restrictions (specifying a station to travel via) or "negative" restrictions (specifying stations to avoid).

Often, more than one route would be available for a journey, with fares being different for each. In the illustrated example, the journey must be made via BRISTOL. An example of a "negative" restriction applicable to this journey would be NOT READING.

Restrictions limiting travel on a certain TOC also exist; for example, a Standard Open Return between BIRMINGHAM STNS and LONDON TERMINALS could be issued with route CENTRAL/SILVLINK, allowing travel on Central Trains and Silverlink only.

A dagger (†; described in publications as a "Maltese cross") may appear before the route if the ticket is valid for a cross-London journey on the London Underground. If there is nothing else to enter here, then ANY PERMITTED appears.

20: Time of issue
The time of issue of the ticket, in 24-hour mode. The letters MIN may appear to the right of here if the ticket has had a minimum fare applied.

Legacy
Although APTIS is no longer used, most National Rail tickets are printed to a similar design (Standard New Generation). 

On the original APTIS tickets, the field describers such as "Class" and "Ticket type" were pre-printed on the ticket stock, but now all information is printed on the stock by the issuing machine.

A new design of ticket was introduced from March 2014.

References

British Rail fares and ticketing
Fare collection systems in the United Kingdom
Travel technology